Charles B. Caulker is Paramount Chief of Bumpe Chiefdom, Moyamba District, Southern Province, Sierra Leone.

In April 2016, Caulker made a trip to the United States where he made speeches about his plans to support and protect the children of Bumpe.

References

Living people
Political office-holders in Sierra Leone
Charles B.
Year of birth missing (living people)